, is a women's professional wrestling, or Joshi Puroresu, promotion created in 2007 after the dissolution and closure of JDStar.  The company was formed by Mikiko Futagami, or Gami, former JDStar wrestler Yumi Ohka, and former JDStar booker Tatsuya Takeshi, who assumed the role of President for the new company.  The company has had a very slow growth and grassroots rise, and is one of the few women's promotions in Japan to do shows on weekdays.

2010 was the biggest year for Wave, which saw them run Tokyo's Korakuen Hall for the first time, along with their first television broadcast by Samurai! TV, which was also a first. Prior to the show, Wave's shows were (and still are) primarily sold as DVDs.

Gami wrestled her retirement match on December 30, 2013, but remains with the promotion behind the scenes, running it through Zabun, Co., Ltd.

On May 3, 2016, Wave announced it was launching its own internet streaming site, Wave Network, the following month.

Roster

Wrestlers

Staff 
 Atsushi Ishiguro (referee)
 Michiko Nonaka (Announcer)
 Kiri Yoshino (Announcer)
 Mikiko Futagami (executive producer)
 Toshie Uematsu (trainer)

Notable alumni

Female

 Akane Fujita
 Aoi Kizuki
 Arisa Nakajima
 Asami Kawasaki
 Asuka
 Aya Yuki
 Ayako Hamada
 Ayako Sato
 Ayame Sasamura
 Ayumi Kurihara
 Bullfight Sora
 Cherry
 Chihiro Hashimoto
 Chikayo Nagashima
 Dash Chisako
 Dynamite Kansai
 Fairy Nipponbashi
 Gami
 Hanako Nakamori
 Hibiki
 Hibiscus Mii
 Hikaru Shida
 Hiroe Nagahama
 Kagetsu
 Kana
 Kaho Kobayashi
 Kaori Yoneyama
 Kaoru Ito
 Kaoru Maeda
 Kayoko Haruyama
 Kazuki
 Kyoko Kimura
 Makoto
 Maika Ozaki
 Maria
 Maruko Nagasaki
 Matsuya Uno
 Mei Hoshizuki
 Melanie Cruise
 Mika Iida
 Mio Shirai
 Misaki Ohata
 Mochi Miyagi
 Moeka Haruhi
 Nao Komatsu
 Natsumi Maki
 Rabbit Miu
 Ran Yu-Yu
 Rina Amikura
 Rina Shingaki
 Ryo Mizunami
 Sawako Shimono
 Sareee
 Sayaka Obihiro
 Senri Kuroki
 Shiori Akiba
 Shizuku Tsukata
 Shuu Shibutani
 Sumire Natsu
 Syuri
 Tae Honma
 Takumi Iroha
 Tomoka Nakagawa
 Tomoko Watanabe
 Totoro Satsuki
 Tsubasa Kuragaki
 Tsukasa Fujimoto
 Waka Tsukiyama
 Yako Fujigasaki
 Yuko Sakurai
 Yuu Yamagata

Male

 Isami Kodaka
 Tank Nagai
 Yuko Miyamoto

Championships 

Other promoted

Annual tournaments

References

External links 

 Pro Wrestling Wave Official Website (in Japanese)

 
Japanese women's professional wrestling promotions
Shibuya
2007 establishments in Japan